Phyllophaga farcta is a species of scarab beetle in the family Scarabaeidae. It is found in North America.

References

Further reading

 

Melolonthinae
Articles created by Qbugbot
Beetles described in 1856
Taxa named by John Lawrence LeConte